Dione glycera, the Andean silverspot, is a species of butterfly of the subfamily Heliconiinae in the family Nymphalidae found in Peru, Venezuela and Colombia.

References

Butterflies described in 1861
Heliconiini
Nymphalidae of South America
Taxa named by Baron Cajetan von Felder
Taxa named by Rudolf Felder